Camp Carleton was the largest of several military camps to be maintained at various times in the vicinity of San Bernardino. It was established in the fall of 1861 by Captain William A. McCleave and a detachment of the 1st California Cavalry to check any successionest activities in San Bernardino County.  After the camp was flooded in the Great Flood of 1862, the camp's garrison was moved to El Monte, where they established New Camp Carleton.

References

Camp Carleton
El Monte, California
1861 establishments in California